Air France operates a fleet of 205 aircraft, mostly Airbus aircraft. Its narrow-body fleet consists of all-four Airbus A320ceo family variants, on the other hand the wide-body aircraft of Airbus A330, Airbus A350, Boeing 777 and Boeing 787 serve as long-haul operations.  The airline has also ordered the short-to-medium-haul Airbus A220 to replace their aging Airbus A318s and Airbus A319s.

Current fleet
, Air France (excluding its subsidiaries Air France Hop and Transavia France) operates the following registered aircraft:

Fleet history

Previously, Air France operated the following aircraft types:

Air France also briefly operated Convair 990 and Douglas DC-8-61 jet aircraft.

See also
 British Airways fleet
 KLM fleet
 Lufthansa fleet

References

Air France–KLM
Lists of aircraft by operator